"Mille regretz" is a French chanson from the 15th century which in its 4 part setting is usually credited to Josquin des Prez. Josquin's version is in the Phrygian mode. Its plangent simplicity made it a popular basis for reworkings (such as the mass setting by Cristóbal de Morales, and the 6vv (SATTBB) chanson by Nicolas Gombert), the variations for vihuela known as "La Canción del Emperador" by Luis de Narváez, as well as more recent sets of variations and threnody. Translations of the song differ in their interpretation of the words 'fache/face amoureuse' in line 2. (variously 'amorous anger' or 'loving face'.)

Text:
Mille regretz de vous abandonnerEt d'eslonger vostre fache amoureuse,
Jay si grand dueil et paine douloureuse,Quon me verra brief mes jours definer.

In Modern French:
Mille regrets de vous abandonner et de m'éloigner de votre visage amoureux. 
J’ai si grand deuil et peine douloureuse qu’on verra vite mes jours prendre fin.

English Translation:
A thousand regrets at deserting you
and leaving behind your loving face,
I feel so much sadness and such painful distress,
that it seems to me my days will soon dwindle away.

The authorship of the original as by Josquin has been disputed.

The chanson was said to be a favorite of King Charles I of Spain.

References

Compositions by Josquin des Prez
Renaissance chansons